The Little Colonel is a 1935 American comedy drama film directed by David Butler. The screenplay by William M. Conselman was adapted from the children's novel of the same name by Annie Fellows Johnston, originally published in 1895. It focuses on the reconciliation of an estranged father and daughter in the years following the American Civil War.   The film stars Shirley Temple, Lionel Barrymore, Evelyn Venable, John Lodge, Bill Robinson, and Hattie McDaniel.

Cast
 Shirley Temple as Lloyd Sherman
 Lionel Barrymore as Colonel Lloyd
 Evelyn Venable as Elizabeth Lloyd Sherman
 John Lodge as Jack Sherman
 Sidney Blackmer as Swazey
 Stephen Chase as Hull
 William Burress as Dr. Scott
 Frank Darien as Nebler
 Bill Robinson as Walker
 Robert Warwick as Colonel Gray
 Hattie McDaniel as Becky 'Mom Beck' Porter
 Geneva Williams as Maria
 Avonnie Jackson as May Lily
 Nyanza Potts as Henry Clay

Production

The Little Colonel is best known for the famous staircase tap dance between Robinson and Temple. It was the first interracial dance pairing in Hollywood history and was so controversial that it was cut out in the Southern United States. The idea was actually first proposed by Fox head Winfield Sheehan after a discussion with D. W. Griffith. Sheehan set his sights on Robinson, but unsure of his ability as an actor, arranged for a contract that would be voided if Robinson failed the dramatic test. Robinson passed the test and was brought in to both star with Temple and to teach her tap dancing. They quickly hit it off, as Temple recounted years later:

Robinson walked a step ahead of us, but when he noticed me hurrying to catch up, he shortened his stride to accommodate mine. I kept reaching up for his hand, but he hadn't looked down and seemed unaware. Fannie called his attention to what I was doing, so he stopped short, bent low over me, his eyes wide and rows of brilliant teeth showing in a wide smile. When he took my hand in his, it felt large and cool. For a few moments, we continued walking in silence. "Can I call you Uncle Billy?" I asked. "Why sure you can," he replied... "But then I get to call you darlin′." It was a deal. From then on, whenever we walked together it was hand in hand, and I was always his "darlin′."

During the filming, Temple drew the ire of veteran actor Lionel Barrymore when she prompted him for one of his lines after he forgot it, causing him to storm off in a fit of anger. Temple was sent off to apologize to Barrymore, but, instead of directly apologizing, told him she thought he was the best actor in the world and asked for his autograph, defusing the situation and bringing Barrymore back to the set.

This film made brief usage of early Technicolor film, which required heavy usage of red-hued makeup for the actors. It would be the only time that Temple would wear makeup on the set of her Fox films.

Release

Distribution
When screened for audiences in Southern states, to ensure the film's widest distribution, Fox removed the staircase scene where Temple and Robinson touch hands.

Critical responses

Andre Sennwald in his New York Times review of March 22, 1935, thought the film "[a]ll adrip with magnolia whimsy and vast, unashamed portions of synthetic Dixie atmosphere". He further wrote that the film was "so ruthless in its exploitation of Miss Temple's great talent for infant charm that it seldom succeeds in being properly lively and gay". He finished his review noting the audience applauded for a full eleven seconds after the final fade-out, and that the film "ought to bring out the best in every one who sees it."

Home media
In 2009, the film was available on videocassette and DVD in both the original black-and-white version and a computer-colorized version of the original. Some versions included theatrical trailers and other special features.

See also
 Shirley Temple filmography
 Lionel Barrymore filmography

References
Footnotes

Works cited

 

Bibliography
   In her essay "Cuteness and Commodity Aesthetics: Tom Thumb and Shirley Temple", Lori Merish examines 'the cult of cuteness' in America.

External links
 
 Annie Fellows Johnston and the Little Colonel
 Kate Matthews Collection (includes illustrations for The Little Colonel books by Johnston's friend and neighbor, photographer Kate Matthews)
 
 
 

1935 films
1930s color films
1930s historical comedy-drama films
American historical comedy-drama films
American black-and-white films
Censored films
1930s English-language films
Films directed by David Butler
Films scored by Cyril J. Mockridge
Films set in Kentucky
Films set in the 1870s
Fox Film films
Films based on American novels
1930s American films